Zarzecze  (Zarichchia) is a village in Przeworsk County, Subcarpathian Voivodeship, in south-eastern Poland. It is the seat of the gmina (administrative district) called Gmina Zarzecze.

The village has a population of 1,400.

Dzieduszycki Palace is located here.

References

Zarzecze